Eutrema is a genus of flowering plants of the family Brassicaceae, native to the Holarctic. Its best known member is wasabi, Eutrema japonicum. The name comes from the Greek εὐ- (eu-) 'well' et τρῆμα (trêma) 'hole', because of a hole in the septum of the fruit.

Species
Species accepted by the Plants of the World Online as of October 2022:

Eutrema altaicum 
Eutrema angustiseptatum 
Eutrema baimashanicum 
Eutrema botschantzevii 
Eutrema boufordii 
Eutrema bulbiferum 
Eutrema cordifolium 
Eutrema deltoideum 
Eutrema edwardsii 
Eutrema fontanum 
Eutrema giganteum 
Eutrema grandiflorum 
Eutrema halophilum 
Eutrema heterophyllum 
Eutrema himalaicum 
Eutrema integrifolium 
Eutrema japonicum 
Eutrema lowndesii 
Eutrema minutissimum 
Eutrema nanum 
Eutrema nepalense 
Eutrema parviflorum 
Eutrema penlandii 
Eutrema platypetalum 
Eutrema pseudocordifolium 
Eutrema purii 
Eutrema racemosum 
Eutrema renifolium 
Eutrema salsugineum 
Eutrema scapiflorum 
Eutrema schulzii 
Eutrema sherriffii 
Eutrema sinense 
Eutrema sulphureum 
Eutrema tenue 
Eutrema thibeticum 
Eutrema tianshanense 
Eutrema verticillatum 
Eutrema violifolium 
Eutrema watsonii 
Eutrema wuchengyii 
Eutrema xingshanense 
Eutrema yungshunense 
Eutrema yunnanense 
Eutrema zhuxiense

References

 
Brassicaceae genera